Warren James Prest (9 December 1932 – 6 February 2008) was an Australian rules footballer who played with Essendon in the Victorian Football League (VFL). He later played with Preston in the Victorian Football Association (VFA), Epping, and was captain-coach of Mernda.

Notes

External links 

Essendon Football Club past player profile

1932 births
2008 deaths
Australian rules footballers from Victoria (Australia)
Essendon Football Club players
Aberfeldie Football Club players
Preston Football Club (VFA) players
Epping Football Club players
People educated at St. Bernard's College, Melbourne